Wevertown is a hamlet in the Adirondack Mountains/Adirondack Park. It is in the town of Johnsburg in the northwestern corner of Warren County, New York, United States, and is part of the Glens Falls metropolitan area.

Geography 
The hamlet is northeast of Johnsburg hamlet on Route 8, approximately eight  miles east of North Creek.  The latitude of Wevertown is 43.633N. The longitude is -73.941W.  The elevation is 1,066 feet.  Wevertown appears on the North Creek United States Geological Survey (USGS) Map. Wevertown is part of the Upper Hudson Watershed—02020001.  Nearby mountains include: Gore Mountain, McGann Mountain, Gage Mountain, Pine Mountain, Eleventh Mountain, and Pete Gay Mountain, Ethan Mountain, Henderson Mountain.  Nearby lakes include Friends Lake and Loon Lake.

History 
Wevertown was founded by John Wever (1782-1870) and wife Mercy Barney Wever (1784-1865), who operated a sawmill.  Wevertown was originally a tannery that opened in 1833, and called at times Nobles Corners.  The first postmaster was appointed before 1850.

References

External links 
NYS Adirondack Park Agency - Extensive park information
Adirondack Museum

Hamlets in Warren County, New York